Candice Wyatt (born 8 October 1982) is an Australian journalist and news presenter for Melbourne's Ten Eyewitness News. She has worked for the broadcaster since October 2010.

Career
After graduating from VCE in the rural Victorian town of Terang Candice Wyatt completed a Bachelor of Arts Journalism at Deakin University in Geelong. From 2003–2005 Candice worked at Melbourne’s Werribee Times newspaper. In 2006 she moved interstate and began her broadcast journalism career at TNT a Seven Network affiliated TV station in Tasmania. While in Tasmania she reported on the Beaconsfield Mine Disaster which made international news headlines. In 2008 she moved to ABC Ballarat where she later became the Senior Journalist for the ABC rural bureau.

In 2010 Wyatt joined the Ten Network at its Melbourne station ATV10. For two years she was the station's crime reporter for Ten News Melbourne . In this role she reported on Jill Meagher's tragic death. She also chased drug mules to Malaysia and Indonesia and covered the disappearance of flight MH370. She was the first reporter to go live from Bali as Schapelle Corby was released from prison. Wyatt has also appeared on the Network's current affairs show The Project as a reporter and co-host.

In November 2014 she became the permanent co-anchor for Melbourne's Ten Eyewitness News with Stephen Quartermain. Wyatt co-anchored the bulletin until February 2017, when she returned to field reporting, She remains a fill-in presenter for the bulletin.

In 2017 she was contracted to the Essendon Football Club as a roving reporter and special event MC. Her work can be viewed on the club's online station, "Bomber TV". She is also a passionate Essendon FC supporter.

Personal life
Candice Wyatt is an ambassador for the Cure Brain Cancer Foundation after losing her 56-year-old mother to the disease in 2013. She enjoys spending her free time socialising. She is also an Essendon Football Club supporter.

She is the former girlfriend of Australian cricketer Glenn Maxwell.

References

10 News First presenters
Australian television journalists
Living people
1982 births